KFXM-LP (98.3 FM) is a low-power FM radio station broadcasting oldies spanning the 1950s, 1960s and 1970s, with more than 36,000 selections in rotation, including novelties and instrumentals. Licensed to Lancaster, CaliforniaUnited States, the station is owned by The Organization For the Preservation & Cultivation of Radio, a nonprofit 501(c)3. The station went on the air October 4, 2004, at 96.7 FM and moved to 98.3 FM on March 1, 2017. KFXM-LP uses the "Channel 98" jingles of former (1958-68) Los Angeles top-40 station KFWB. 

The original KFXM (now KTIE) was a Top Forty station at 590 kHz on the AM band in the Riverside and San Bernardino, California market area from 1959 to 1985.

In mid-September 2022, KFXM experienced issues with their transmitter and their operating software and began playing a loop of songs by Paul Anka, Anne Murray and the Bee Gees. In early October, KFXM resumed normal broadcasting. Many 1980s-1990s songs were added to the playlist. On October 5, KFXM went off the air. The station's request line and business phone numbers have been disconnected. 
As of March 2023 the status of KFXM is unknown to whether they resumed broadcasting as the station has not filed to go silent

References

External links

FXM-LP
Radio stations established in 2005
Oldies radio stations in the United States
FXM-LP
2005 establishments in California